Worth is a village in Cook County, Illinois, United States, a suburb of Chicago. Per the 2020 census, the population was 10,970.

Geography
Worth is located at  (41.688827, -87.792659).

Demographics
As of the 2020 census there were 10,970 people, 4,042 households, and 2,670 families residing in the village. The racial makeup of the village was 77.38% White, 4.42% African American, 0.36% Native American, 2.24% Asian, 0.05% Pacific Islander, 7.07% from other races, and 8.47% from two or more races. Hispanic or Latino of any race were 15.57% of the population.

There were 4,042 households, out of which 53.41% had children under the age of 18 living with them, 47.43% were married couples living together, 14.65% had a female householder with no husband present, and 33.94% were non-families. 27.41% of all households were made up of individuals, and 8.51% had someone living alone who was 65 years of age or older. The average household size was 3.27 and the average family size was 2.60.

The village's age distribution consisted of 22.0% under the age of 18, 9.2% from 18 to 24, 24.9% from 25 to 44, 27.9% from 45 to 64, and 15.7% who were 65 years of age or older. The median age was 42.2 years. For every 100 females, there were 97.4 males. For every 100 females age 18 and over, there were 93.4 males.

The median income for a household in the village was $59,464, and the median income for a family was $68,936. Males had a median income of $43,617 versus $29,739 for females. The per capita income for the village was $28,284. About 10.6% of families and 13.3% of the population were below the poverty line, including 24.2% of those under age 18 and 6.1% of those age 65 or over.

Note: the US Census treats Hispanic/Latino as an ethnic category. This table excludes Latinos from the racial categories and assigns them to a separate category. Hispanics/Latinos can be of any race.

Village government 

The Village of Worth operates under a President-Trustee form of Government with a Village President (Mayor) and a Village Board composed of six Village Trustees (Councilmen / Aldermen) elected at large.

The elected officials are:

President Mary Werner (Independent) - Current term expires in April 2025
Clerk Bonnie M. Price (Independent) - Current term expires in April 2025
Trustee Rich Dziedzic (Independent), - Current term expires in April 2025
Trustee Pete Kats (Independent), - Current term expires in April 2023
Trustee Tedd Muersch, Jr. (Independent), - Current term expires in April 2025
Trustee Laura Packwood (Independent), - Current term expires in April 2023
Trustee Kevin Ryan (Independent), - Current term expires in April 2023
Trustee Brad Urban (Independent), - Current term expires in April 2025

All six trustees are elected at large with three being elected at the same time as the President and three being elected two years later.

The Village of Worth has separately elected boards, independent of the Village to administer:

Worth Park District
Worth Public Library District
Worth School District 127

State and federal government
Worth is located in Illinois's 6th congressional district which is represented by Sean Casten (D-Downers Grove).

Worth is located within 18th State Senate District, which is represented by William Cunningham (D-Chicago); and located in the 35th Representative District, which is represented by Fran Hurley (D-Chicago), and the 36th Representative District, which is represented by Kelly Burke (D-Evergreen Park).

Township and county government
The village of Worth is located in the 6th and 17th County Board Districts. Worth is in two townships - east of Harlem Avenue is Worth Township, and west of Harlem Avenue is Palos Township.

Infrastructure
The North Palos Fire Protection District operates Station #3 in Worth.

Education
Worth is served by several public school districts. Worth School District 127 operates public elementary and middle schools.

Some residents are zoned to Alan B. Shepard High School of Community High School District 218 and others are zoned to Amos Alonzo Stagg High School of Consolidated High School District 230.

Moraine Valley Community College is the area community college.

Worth Public Library District operates public libraries.

Transportation 
Worth has a station on Metra's SouthWest Service, which provides daily rail service between Manhattan, Illinois and Chicago Union Station.

References

External links
 Village of Worth

 
Villages in Illinois
Villages in Cook County, Illinois
Chicago metropolitan area
Populated places established in 1914
1914 establishments in Illinois